Sames or Samos II Theosebes Dikaios ( – died  109 BC) was the second king of Commagene. He was the son and successor of Ptolemaeus of Commagene.

Sames reigned as king between 130–109 BC. During his reign, Sames ordered the construction of the fortress at Samosata which is now submerged by the Atatürk Reservoir. Sames died in 109 BC. His wife was Pythodoris, daughter of the Kings of Pontus, and his son and successor was Mithridates I Callinicus.

References

Sources
 
 
 
 
 

Kings of Commagene
109 BC deaths
2nd-century BC rulers
Year of birth unknown